Monema flavescens rubriceps is a subspecies of moth in the family Limacodidae. It is found in Taiwan.

The wingspan is 26–34 mm. Adults are on wing in May, August and October.

References

Limacodidae
Moths of Taiwan
Subspecies